Secondo Ponzio Pilato (or "According to Ponzio Pilato", which is the traditional way of attributing Gospels authors' names) is a 1987 Italian historical comedy-drama film written and directed by Luigi Magni. The film is an example of Magnis's typical approach to critical interpretation of history. It was filmed between Syracuse, Algeria and Tunisia.  Stefania Sandrelli was awarded the Silver Ribbon for Best Actress prize for her performance in the movie.

Plot 
The Roman governor Pontius Pilate then runs Jesus Christ and then, never mind, allows Christ to be executed after being scourged. Jesus Christ had promised to his followers that he would be resurrected within three days after his death. From this point Pontius Pilate begins to be opposed and hated by the Roman people that he realizes his mistake and that the Jews, who in turn are severely punished by the Emperor Tiberius.The family of Pontius is all against him, and especially in the Roman province in the Galilee erupts into chaos when Jesus really resurrects. After a military intervention of Tiberius in the area where Jesus lived to restore order, approve without much thinking about it a law that condemns Ponzio. He in fact did so, although it was powerful, that the situation capitulate against him, that he wants to be puntio for his guilt of having shamefully condemned the poor Jesus After asking pardon of God, Pontius Pilate and as a result beheaded ago for the conversion can be defined as "blessed."

Cast 
Nino Manfredi as Pontius Pilate
Stefania Sandrelli as  Claudia Procula
Lando Buzzanca as  Valerian
Mario Scaccia as  Tiberius
Flavio Bucci as   Herod Antipas
Antonio Pierfederici as  Joseph of Arimathea 
Relja Basic as  Annas
Cosimo Cinieri as  Caiaphas
Roberto Herlitzka as  Barabbas 
Carlo Panchetti as  Jesus
Rita Capobianco as  Salome
Luisa De Santis as  Estherina
Lara Naszinski as  The angel
Pino Quartullo as  Longinus
Ricky Tognazzi as  Legionary

References

External links

1987 films
Commedia all'italiana
Films directed by Luigi Magni
1980s Italian-language films
1980s Italian films